The Erzya-Moksha Autonomy , ,  was a name of an administrative division of the Russian SFSR, Soviet Union approved by Executive Committee of Erzya-Moksha Autonomous oblast before July 16, 1928. The Executive Committee name didn't change till 1930. The conventional name of the Oblast was changed to Mordvin Okrug on July 16, 1928. The administrative centre first was planned to be the oldest Oblast city Temnikov but it was established in Saransk because of the railroad absence in Temnikov.

History 

The Erzya-Moksha Autonomy was approved in 1928 as Mordvin Okrug according to personal approval of Josef Stalin, who attended the meeting of the Executive Committee. Since Mokshas and Erzyas lived sparcely in many governorates of former Russian Empire Stalin believed it was impossible to establish many autonomous districts. That was Mikifor Surdin, ethnic Moksha who proposed to establish not Erzya-Moksha Autonomy, but a Mordvin okrug. Since most members of the Executive Committee were neither ethnic Erzyas nor Mokshas and did not understand Russian well, Surdin said that using Mordva as ethnonym would be more understandable since they are not supposed to hear about Erzya or Moksha ethnic groups. Stalin liked this variant. The Erzya-Moksha Autonomous oblast lost its ethnic (Rus. national) status and been renamed to Mordvin Okrug. Mikifor Surdin has been being cursed till now for that, in spite of the fact he was executed during the Great Purge. That was the time when the autonomy name changed to Mordvin. Only "ethnonym" Mordvin was allowed in documents for Erzya and Moksha since then.

Okrug was established in the area populated mainly by Erzyas and Mokshas as a part  on July 16, 1928. On October 20, 1929, the Okrug was included into .
On January 19, 1930, Okrug transformed into .

Administrative division 
The Okrug was divided into 23 districts:

See also

Mordovia in the Soviet Union
First Secretary of the Mordovian Communist Party

References

Sources 

 
 
 
 
 
 Republic of Mordovia 
 80 years anniversary of the Erzya-Moksha Autonomy

Autonomous oblasts of the Soviet Union
States and territories established in 1928
Oblasts of the Russian Soviet Federative Socialist Republic
1928 establishments in the Soviet Union